Patriarch of Cilicia may refer to:

 the Eastern Catholic Armenian Catholic Patriarch of Cilicia
 the Orthodox Armenian Catholicos of Cilicia